The Bank of Khyber is a provincial government bank owned by Government of Khyber Pakhtunkhwa and based in Peshawar, Pakistan, with 191 branches all over the country.

History
It was set up as a state-owned, regional bank in 1991 along with the Bank of Punjab and the First Women Bank. It offers Conventional banking, Islamic banking services and microfinance loans. 

The bank had an initial public offering of its shares at Karachi Stock Exchange in January 2006.

Branch network
Currently the bank has 191 branches as of August 2021. The bank is operating with Conventional as well as dedicated Islamic Banking Branches. Further, sub branches and booths are also providing basic banking facilities to the customers. Through this network, the bank is able to offer wide range of products and services to its valuable customers.

BOK Digital 
The bank launched its mobile application called BOK Digital on January 15, 2021.

References

 Daily Times, Tuesday, January 17, 2006: Bank of Khyber IPO to be held from 25th
 Dawn, January 1, 2006: Bank of Khyber IPO on Jan 26-27
 The Nation: Bank of Khyber subscription opens today

External links 

Pakistani companies established in 1991
Banks established in 1991
Banks of Pakistan
Companies listed on the Pakistan Stock Exchange
Government of Khyber Pakhtunkhwa
Government-owned banks of Pakistan
Economy of Peshawar